Sommer is a Danish TV-drama aired on DR1 in 2008. The series was created by Jesper W. Nielsen and Karina Dam

Cast

External links
 DRs side om Sommer
 Sommer på Settet.dk
 

Danish drama television series
2008 Danish television series debuts
2000s Danish television series
Danish-language television shows